The 5th round of the inaugural British Formula 3000 Championship, saw the series arrive back in Kent, for their second visit of the year to Brands Hatch, on 25 June.

Report

Entry
A total of 12 F3000 cars were entered for this, the fifth round of the 1989 British F3000 Championship.

Qualifying
Roland Ratzenberger took pole position for Spirit Motorsport team in their Cosworth-engined Reynard 88D. He was joined on the front row by Gary Brabham in a similar Reynard, prepared by Bromley Motorsport.

Race
The race was held over 60 laps of the Brands Hatch Indy circuit. Gary Brabham took the winner spoils for the Bromley Motorsport team, driving their Reynard-Cosworth 88D. The Aussie won in a time of 40:38.73mins., averaging a speed of 106.729 mph. Second place went to poleman, Roland Ratzenberger in Spirit Motorsport's Reynard-Cosworth 88D, who was just 2.75secs behind. Third was Grand Prix Motorcycle road racer, Marco Greco completed the podium for the Eddie Jordan Racing in his Cosworth engined Reynard 88D, while former F1 driver, Desiré Wilson made an appearance for GA Motorsport in their Lola T88/50, finishing fourth.

Classification

Race

Class winners in bold

 Fastest lap: Gary Brabham, 39.90secs. (109.173 mph)

References

British Formula 3000 Championship